USS Sebastian (AK-211) was an  that was constructed for the US Navy during the closing period of World War II. She was retained by the Navy for only a short period of service before being inactivated as "excess to needs."

Construction
Sebastian was laid down on 10 August 1944, under US Maritime Commission (MARCOM) contract, MC hull 2165, by the Leathem D. Smith Shipbuilding Company, Sturgeon Bay, Wisconsin; launched on 21 December 1944; sponsored by Miss J.C. Sullivan; delivered to the U.S. Maritime Commission on 31 January 1945; acquired by the Navy on loan charter on 10 August 1945; converted to an AK at New Orleans, Louisiana; and commissioned on 11 September 1945.

Service history

World War II-related service
Commissioned after the end of World War II, Sebastian was retained by the Navy only briefly.

Post-war inactivation
She was decommissioned on 14 November 1945 and simultaneously returned to MARCOM's War Shipping Administration (WSA) for subsequent maritime service under the name Coastal Highflyer. The name Sebastian was struck from the Navy List on 28 November 1945.

Merchant service
On 4 January 1947, the Fall River Navigation Company chartered Coastal Highflyer. On 29 July 1947, she ran aground at the east end of Cayo Moa, Grand Shoal, Cuba.

She was laid up in the Reserve Fleet in Wilmington, North Carolina, 18 May 1948.

On 2 September 1960, she was put up for sale but received no bids.

US Army service
On 31 October 1966, Coastal Highflyer was loaned to the US Army to serve as a training ship for stevedores. In May 1967 her name was changed to Resolve.

She was sold for scrap on 22 January 1976, to Andy International, Inc.

Notes 

Citations

Bibliography 

Online resources

External links

 

Alamosa-class cargo ships
Ships built in Sturgeon Bay, Wisconsin
1944 ships
World War II auxiliary ships of the United States
Sebastian County, Arkansas